North Salmara is a sub-division in Bongaigaon district, Assam, India. The sub-division is headquartered at Abhayapuri.

Geography

Location
National Highway 31B starts from North Salmara.

Tourist places
Mahadev Hill, Nigamghola, Kakoijana Reserve forest, Taamranga Lake, Dolani Beel, Abhayapuri, 10th-century Ganesh Temple, Koya Eco Park, The Great Giant Banyan Tree, Jogighopa Cave

References

External links
 About North Salmara
 Satellite map of North Salmara

Cities and towns in Bongaigaon district